Cloverhill Remand Prison is located on Cloverhill Road, Clondalkin, Dublin 22. It has a bed capacity of 431 and its average daily number of inmates resident in 2009 was 438.

History

Adjacent to Wheatfield Prison, with which it shares many services, Cloverhill was opened in 1999. It is a purpose built remand prison and houses most of the remand prisoners in the state.

It and the Dóchas Centre, a women's prison, hold 90 per cent of persons detained under processes of administration detention for immigration related issues.

See also
 Prisons in Ireland

Notes

Prisons in the Republic of Ireland